Open water swimming competitions at the 2019 World Beach Games in Doha, Qatar were held on 13 October.

Medal summary

Medal table

Medalists

Participating nations

References

External links
Results Book

International swimming competitions
Open water swimming
2019
World Beach Games
2019